The 2006 Korean League Cup, also known as the 2006 Samsung Hauzen Cup, was the 19th competition of the Korean League Cup. It was a League Cup, but was run like a league format in this year. All teams played each other once, playing 13 matches each. 

Samsung Hauzen Cup is the alternative competition of K League during the activity of the South Korea national team. The 2006 edition was held during summer, allowing the top K League players to focus on the 2006 FIFA World Cup in Germany.

Table

Results

Top scorers

Awards

Source:

See also
2006 in South Korean football
2006 K League
2006 Korean FA Cup

References

External links

2006
2006
2006 domestic association football cups
2006 in South Korean football